SS Raven, or SY Raven, may refer to:

 , a steam barge built in 1871 for service on Windermere in the English Lake District and now preserved at the Windermere Steamboat Museum, also referred to as the SY Raven
 , a steam yacht built in 1889 for service on Ullswater in the English Lake District and since converted to the MY Raven
 , an Arcturus-class attack cargo ship of the United States Navy, originally built in 1941 as SS Raven for the Maritime Commission but transferred to the Navy

Ship names